KDRT-LP (95.7 FM) is a low powered radio station licensed to Davis, California, United States. The station is currently owned by Davis Community Television DBA Davis Media Access, who operate the public-access television DCTV for the City of Davis and the educational-access television channel DJUSD TV for the Davis Joint Unified School District.

See also
List of community radio stations in the United States

References

External links
 

DRT-LP
Community radio stations in the United States
DRT-LP